The Skillern House is a historic house at 3470 East Skillern Road in Fayetteville, Arkansas. Built in 1904–05, it is a fine local example of Folk Victorian architecture. It has Queen Anne detailing, including delicate turned porch posts with brackets, and decorative cut shingles in the gables.

The house was listed on the National Register of Historic Places in 2015.

See also
National Register of Historic Places listings in Washington County, Arkansas

References

Houses on the National Register of Historic Places in Arkansas
Houses in Fayetteville, Arkansas
National Register of Historic Places in Fayetteville, Arkansas
Houses completed in 1904